East-the-Water Cemetery (also known as Bideford Church Cemetery) was the Church of England burial ground for East-the-Water, once a separate village but now a suburb of Bideford, in Devon, England. Located on Barnstaple Road, the cemetery  is abandoned and neglected, and the Victorian cemetery chapel is a dangerous structure on the verge of collapse. Burials in Bideford now take place at Bideford Higher Cemetery.

The cemetery, opened in 1890, contains 476 graves holding 947 people. Among these are 20 Commonwealth War Graves Commission burials, 7 from World War I and 13 from World War II, with their distinctive headstones.

Notable burials
Buried at the back of the cemetery in adjacent plots are two winners of the Victoria Cross:
 General George Channer  (1843–1905)
 Lieutenant General Sir Gerald Graham  (1831–1899)

Gallery

References

External links

 

Cemeteries in Devon
Bideford
Buildings and structures in Bideford
Commonwealth War Graves Commission cemeteries in England